Many settlements in Macedonia region in Northern Greece had Greek and non-Greek forms. 
Most of those names were in use during the multinational environment of the Ottoman Empire.  Some of the forms were identifiably of Greek origin, others of Slavic, yet others of Turkish or more obscure origins.
Following the First World War and the Graeco-Turkish War which followed, an exchange of population took place between Greece, Serbia, Bulgaria and Turkey.
(Treaty of Neuilly, between Greece and Bulgaria and Treaty of Lausanne, between Greece and Turkey)
The villages of the exchanged populations (Bulgarians and Muslims) in Greece were resettled with Greeks from Asia Minor and local Macedonian Greeks.

Since the Greek state became ethnic
the Greek government renamed many places with revived ancient names, local Greek-language names, or translations of the non-Greek names.: The multi ethnic names were officially removed and the former multiethnic composition of the region was almost denied.
A lot of historical Greek names from Asia Minor were also introduced in the region mainly by the resettled refugees.
Many Demotic Greek names were also replaced by a Katharevousa Greek form, usually different only morphologically.

References

External links
  List compiled by the Institute for Neohellenic Research

Drama (regional unit)
Drama
Place names of Turkish origin in Greece